Catharina Anna Petronella Antonia "Kitty" Courbois (13 July 1937 – 11 March 2017) was a Dutch actress. In 2010 she was awarded the Medal of Merit.

Filmography

References

External links

1937 births
2017 deaths
Dutch actresses
People from Nijmegen